Dan Eubanks (born June 11, 1970) is an American politician, having represented District 25 as a Republican in the Mississippi House of Representatives since 2016.

Biography 
Dan Eubanks was born on June 11, 1970, in Hicksville, Ohio. He is a youth minister. He was first elected to represent District 25 as a Republican in the Mississippi House of Representatives in 2015 for the 2016-2020 term. He was re-elected for the 2020-2024 term.

References 

Living people
1970 births
Republican Party members of the Mississippi House of Representatives